Omorgus tasmanicus is a species of hide beetle in the subfamily Omorginae.

References

tasmanicus
Beetles described in 1904